German submarine U-615 was a Type VIIC U-boat of the German Navy (Kriegsmarine) for service during World War II.

Commissioned on 26 March 1942, and commanded by Kapitänleutnant Ralph Kapitzky, she was depth charged and sunk in the Caribbean Sea, north of Porlamar on 7 August 1943, in position , by US 6 Mariner and 1 Ventura aircraft. It was the largest aircraft hunt ever mounted for a single U-boat. Of her crew 4 (including her captain) were killed, and 43 survived.

Design
German Type VIIC submarines were preceded by the shorter Type VIIB submarines. U-615 had a displacement of  when at the surface and  while submerged. She had two shafts and two  propellers.

U-615 was fitted with five  torpedo tubes (four fitted at the bow and one at the stern), fourteen torpedoes, one  SK C/35 naval gun, 220 rounds, and a  C/30 anti-aircraft gun. The boat had a complement of between forty-four and sixty.

Wolfpacks
U-615 took part in 10 wolfpacks, namely:
 Pfeil (12 – 22 September 1942) 
 Blitz (22 – 26 September 1942) 
 Tiger (26 – 30 September 1942) 
 Wotan (5 – 19 October 1942) 
 Draufgänger (1 – 11 December 1942) 
 Ungestüm (11 – 30 December 1942) 
 Burggraf (25 February – 5 March 1943) 
 Raubgraf (7 – 20 March 1943) 
 Seewolf (24 – 30 March 1943) 
 Adler (7 – 13 April 1943)

Summary of raiding history

References

Bibliography

External links

World War II submarines of Germany
1942 ships
U-boats commissioned in 1942
Ships built in Hamburg
U-boats sunk in 1943
U-boats sunk by US aircraft
U-boats sunk by depth charges
World War II shipwrecks in the Caribbean Sea
German Type VIIC submarines
Maritime incidents in August 1943